Norwalk Harbor is a recreational and commercial harbor and seaport
at the estuary of the Norwalk River where it flows into Long Island Sound
in Norwalk, Connecticut, United States.

The last portion of the Norwalk River from the head of navigation 
near Wall Street in Central Norwalk to the Long Island Sound
forms Norwalk Harbor.  It is a federal navigation channel of the 
"recreational and small commercial harbor" variety.

In and around the harbor there are 15 marinas, 13 private clubs with 
boating facilities, and 5 commercial port facilities.  There are more 
than 1800 berthing spaces and more than 500 harbor mooring locations.
About 800 boats may be launched from storage racks at marinas and clubs
as well as via the city maintained launching ramp in Veterans Park.
More than 2700 commercial vessel trips to and from the harbor occur each year.
The main harbor channel is small enough to restrict the size of
vessels that could attempt to use it.  In 2001 waterborne 
commerce in the harbor totaled . Typical freight 
included fuel oil, sand, gravel, stone, and shellfish (particularly oysters and lobsters).

Description 

From the sound the main approach to the harbor lies to the southwest of Rowayton and
Sheffield Island.  The wider and deeper southwest approach is also known as
"Sheffield Harbor", whereas the narrower and shallower eastern approach is known as "Cockenoe Harbor.
There is a -long channel extending from the outer harbor to the head of 
the harbor in Norwalk.
from the outer harbor to Gregory Point in East Norwalk, where it narrows 
The channel then 
widens to  along the wharves to the Washington Street (Stroffolino) Bridge.
Upstream of the Washington street bridge the inner harbor lies along  of the river.
 wide until it terminates at the head of the harbor at the Wall Street bridge in central Norwalk. Another six-foot-deep anchorage area lies adjacent to the head of the harbor at East Norwalk.

List of inner harbor crossings 
From the head of navigation at Wall Street traveling out to the outer harbor there are:
 Wall Street Bridge is an arch bridge in Central Norwalk
 Yankee Doodle Bridge is a girder bridge that carries the Connecticut Turnpike
 Norwalk River Railroad Bridge four track swing bridge of Amtrak and the Metro-North Railroad
 Washington Street, Stroffolino memorial, is a bascule bridge that carries Route 136
There are no bridges across the outer harbor or the approach channels.

History 

In 1614 Dutch navigator Adriaen Block
explored the Connecticut coast aboard the Onrust and mapped the 
Norwalk Islands which lie at the outer boundary of the harbor. He referred 
to the group of islands as the "Archipelago".

As an aid to navigation at the harbor channel entrance the 
Sheffield Island Light was operational by 1826 (on what was called "Smith Island" at the time).
In 1872 the U.S. Army Corps of Engineers started
its first work on harbor improvements in Norwalk.
On January 21, 1897, the United States Congress agreed to spend $73,100.00 on aids to navigation
in Norwalk Harbor including lights and fog signals.  As a result of the expenditure Greens Ledge Light was operational by 1902 and
Pecks Ledge Light was operational by 1906.  The Sheffield Island light was discontinued
as a federally maintained aid to navigation when the Greens Ledge Light was activated.

The Ischoda Yacht Club was founded in 1886 along the western shore of Norwalk Harbor in 
South Norwalk and is among America's oldest Yacht Clubs.  The Norwalk Yacht Club was formed in
August 1894 in Wilson's Cove.

The U.S. Army Corps of Engineers dredged the harbor in 1950.

In October 1955 a great flood washed down the Norwalk River and
destroyed many of the buildings adjacent to the riverbanks.
Today's Freese Park along Main Avenue was a built up commercial block
before October 1955.  The flood left a wake of destruction in the harbor
that took a long time to recover from.

The Connecticut Turnpike was built over the river in 1956-1958.
The salt marsh just south of the Yankee Doodle bridge on the river's 
west bank was turned into a garbage dump, but has since been closed, capped,
and turned into "Oyster Shell Park" (not to be confused with the 
native Siwanoy shell middens across the river on the east bank near "Oyster bend").

The Norwalk Harbor Commission was established in 1984 by the 
Norwalk City Council.  The commission is responsible for
maintaining a Harbor Management plan that includes maintaining
the safe navigation in the harbor, policies for the harbor master,
the promotion of the harbor, and the maintenance of the Visitors
dock at Veterans Park.

The U.S. Army Corps of Engineers finished harbor re-dredging projects in 1980 and again in 2006.
There will be a new dredging project for the inner and river portions of the harbor.

In the spring of 2007 the Marine Unit of the Norwalk Police department
launched a new  police boat the Riva.
On July 10, 2007 the Norwalk Fire Department commissioned 
its first fireboat the Harry Bower named to honor a fire fighter who died in 2005.  In the fall of 2007 the harbor was visited by the 
Seafair a  motor yacht. The visit of the Seafair was
accompanied by private viewings of objects in the vessel's art galleries.

A utility project in the fall of 2007 replaced an electric power transmission line that runs 
from Connecticut to Long Island.  Seven fluid-filled cables originally laid in
1969 were replaced with three new solid dielectric cables. 
The existing cables are joined at the oil-fired electric generating 
substation on Manresa Island in Norwalk Harbor. From there, they cross 
under Norwalk Harbor and Long Island Sound to connect at the Long Island Power Authority’s 
substation in the village of Northport, New York.

The Skyline Princess, a  
motor yacht out of New York, makes port of call stops at Veterans Park.

Geology
The harbor is a "drowned river valley" flooded as the sea rose at the end of the last ice age. Bedrock under the harbor and in the Harborview and Calf Pasture Beach area is interlayered Ordovician trap falls gneisses and Harrison Gneiss with dark minerals hornblende, biotite and garnet. The bedrock has two folds in the harbor area. The earlier, more southerly one was formed at the same time as the Taconic Mountains. That fault runs from Bell Island through Manresa Island to Sprite Island. The second (created during the Acadian mountain-building event of 485–440 million years ago) runs along a line north from Noroton Point on Sheffield Island Harbor toward Exit 15 on Interstate 95.

See also 
 Calf Pasture Beach
 East Norwalk
 Maritime Aquarium at Norwalk
 Norwalk Islands
 Norwalk Oyster Festival
 Norwalk River
 South Norwalk
 Stewart B. McKinney National Wildlife Refuge

Notes and references

External links
Fairfieldcountyonline Norwalk Harbor webcam
University of Connecticut remote sensor
Norwalk River Watershed Association
Norwalk Harbor Tide Information
Harbor Watch/River Watch at Earthplace, Westport, Connecticut
Norwalk River Rowing Association
U.S. Environmental Protection Agency Superfund site at Manresa Island Power Plant
Norwalk Sailing School at Calf Pasture Beach
U.S. Coast Guard Flotilla 72 at Calf Pasture Beach
Norwalk Seaport Association

Geography of Norwalk, Connecticut
Ports and harbors of Connecticut
Long Island Sound
Rowing venues in the United States
Transportation in Fairfield County, Connecticut
Tourist attractions in Norwalk, Connecticut